Mo is an American comedy-drama streaming television series that premiered on August 24, 2022 on Netflix. The series stars Mo Amer as the titular character. The series is loosely based on Amer's own life as a Palestinian refugee living in Houston, Texas. It is co-created by Ramy Youssef and also stars Farah Bsieso, Omar Elba, Teresa Ruiz and Tobe Nwigwe.

In January 2023, Netflix renewed the series for a second and final season.

Premise
Mo follows a Palestinian refugee living in Houston, Texas, who is currently seeking asylum and citizenship in the United States.

Cast and characters

Main
Mo Amer as Mohammed "Mo" Najjar, the protagonist 
 Ahmad Rajeh as young Mohammed "Mo" Najjar
Farah Bsieso as Yusra Najjar, Mo's mother
Omar Elba as Sameer Najjar, Mo's brother
Teresa Ruiz as Maria, Mo's girlfriend
Tobe Nwigwe as Nick, Mo's childhood friend
Michael Y. Kim as Chien, Mo's tattooist and lean dealer
Lee Eddy as Lizzie Horowitz, the Najjars' immigration lawyer
Cherien Dabis as Nadia Robinson (née Najjar), Mo's sister
 Mariah Albishah as young Nadia Najjar

Guest
Paul Wall as a court room security guard
Bun B as a Catholic priest listening to Mo's confession
Bassem Youssef as Abood Rahman, mobile store owner

Episodes

Season 1 (2022)

Reception

Critical response
The series has received critical acclaim for being one of the first major American television shows to portray a Palestinian-American refugee as the protagonist. It currently holds a 100% rating on Rotten Tomatoes, with the critic consensus on the site being: "Frequently hilarious while possessing an absorbing sense of place, Mo is a thoughtful depiction of the immigrant experience that is light on its feet.".

Accolades

References

External links
 
 
 Official screenplay of series premiere

2020s American comedy-drama television series
Palestinian-American culture
2022 American television series debuts
Arabic-language Netflix original programming
English-language Netflix original programming
Spanish-language Netflix original programming
Television series about immigration
Television shows set in Houston
Television series by A24
Works about refugees
Works about immigration to the United States